Oflag VII-C was a World War II German prisoner-of-war camp for officers located in Laufen Castle, in Laufen in south-eastern Bavaria from 1940 to 1942. Most of the prisoners were British officers captured during the Battle of France in 1940. To relieve overcrowding, some of the officers were transferred to Oflag VII-C/Z in Tittmoning Castle.
The Oflag existed only for a short time. In early 1942 all the officers were transferred to Oflag VII-B in Eichstätt.

The castle was then used as an Internment Camp Ilag VII for men from the British Channel Islands of Jersey and Guernsey until the camp was liberated in May 1945. Previously, in September 1944, after lengthy negotiations, 125 elderly and sick prisoners were repatriated to Great Britain via Sweden.   In April 1944 the count of internees in Laufen included 459 British internees (417 Channel Islanders) and 120 American civilians who had been trapped in Europe when war was suddenly declared in December 1941. Even though the camp housed civilians, it continued to be operated by the German Army. The camp was liberated by the U.S. 3rd Army on 5 May 1945.

Eight Channel Island internees died in Laufen camp during the period of internment.

Notable inmates
 John Lingshaw, Channel Islander internee and subsequent German collaborator.
 Josef Nassy, a black expatriate artist of Jewish descent, holding a US passport who created a visual diary of life in the camp.
 Captain Pat Reid, arrived 5 June 1940, escaped 5 September 1940, later British escape officer at Colditz.
 Ambrose Sherwill, President of the Controlling Committee in Guernsey, who became British Camp Senior.
 Jean-Claude Miller, youngest inmate (18 years old), interned early December 1942 with his father John Vassar Miller, because they were Americans trapped in Europe when war was declared.
 Lieutenant J.E.M. ‘Jimmy’ Atkinson of the 7th Battalion The Argyll and Sutherland Highlanders who wrote the Scottish country dance, the Reel of the 51st Highland Division whilst in the camp.
 Desmond Llewelyn, actor, known for playing Q in 17 James Bond films
 John Buxton, scholar, university teacher, poet, and ornithologist.

See also
 List of prisoner-of-war camps in Germany
 Deportations from the German-occupied Channel Islands
 Oflag VII-D in Tittmoning

References

  German army list
  Story of John Bremner, 51st Seaforth Highlanders
 Ilag list
 Deportations from the Channel Islands

POW memoirs
 Duncan, Michael (1954). “Underground from Posen”. London, William Kimber.  ASIN B0000CKW35
 Belson, Dorrien (2003). "Caught! Prisoner of War No. 487" Henley, Bentwyck Henry Publishers Ltd.  
 Davies-Scourfield, Gris (2004). "In Presence of my Foes". Barnsley, Pen and Sword Military. 

Oflags
Berchtesgadener Land
World War II prisoner of war camps in Germany
1940 establishments in Germany
1945 disestablishments in Germany